Bookie, short for bookmaker, is a person or organization that takes bets on at agreed-upon odds.

Bookie or Bookies may also refer to:

People
Bookie Bolin (born 1940), American football player 
Mike Bookie (1904–1944), American soccer player
Dave Bookman (1960–2019), Canadian radio personality
Kid Bookie (born 1992), British rapper

Arts, entertainment, and media
Bookies (film) (2003)

See also
 Book (disambiguation)
 Bookmaker (disambiguation)